Cabarrus or Cabarrús is a surname of French origin. People bearing the name include:
 François Cabarrus, 1st Count of Cabarrús (1752-1810), a Spanish financier born in Bayonne, Aquitaine
 Thérésa Tallien (1773-1835), born Teresa de Cabarrús y Galabert, a French socialite and the daughter of François Cabarrus
 Stephen Cabarrus (1754–1808), an early Speaker of the North Carolina House of Representatives and the namesake of Cabarrus County